IBP may refer to:

Science and technology
 Iso-butyl-propanoic-phenolic acid, marketed as Ibuprofen
 Indian buffet process, a statistical process
 Integration by parts, a technique used in integral calculus
 Invasive blood pressure
 International Biological Program, a large-scale research effort in ecosystem ecology in the 1960s and 1970s

Organizations
 IBP, Inc. (Iowa Beef Processors), a defunct beef-producing company now owned by Tyson Foods
 IBP Co. Limited, a former Indian petroleum company; see V. C. Agrawal
 The Institute for Bird Populations
 Institute of Bankers Pakistan, a banking training institute
 Institute of the Good Shepherd (Institut du Bon Pasteur), a traditional Catholic priest society 
 Integrated Bar of the Philippines, a professional organization of lawyers
 Interim Batasang Pambansa, the unicameral legislature of the Philippines from 1978 to 1984
 International Business Park, a business park in Jurong East, Singapore
 Israel Border Police

Other uses
 Integrated business planning
 Integrative body psychotherapy, a form of body psychotherapy